Jody Pinto (born 1942) is an American environmental artist internationally known for her site-specific public works. In her works as an artist she has over 40 collaborations around the world including the US, Japan, and Israel. In her work as a feminist activist she founded and was active for four years in the organization known as WOAR.

Early life and education
Jody Pinto was born in New York City in 1942  to a family of artist, and carried on this legacy with both her education as well as activism. She attended Pennsylvania Academy of the Fine Arts, winning the William Emlen Cresson Memorial Travel Scholarship while she was there which funded travels throughout Europe after her graduation. She earned her BFA from Philadelphia College of Art.

Work
Pinto's early works confront nature in work performances such as the 1976 digging piece Triple Well Enclosure, which explores excavation and entombment. Pinto's work was never rejected by the public, mainly because she considered her work ethic to be very attentive in what the client and public wanted out of the piece. Taking a break from her art to focus on her activism with WOAR she returned to her art after her four year involvement, and had a new perspective on changing peoples lives through her work. Not only did WOAR give her new perspectives, but it helper her learn how to talk to people, and thus giving her ways to connect and make connections through her art.

Public art
In 1987 Pinto completed her first large-scale permanent public art work Fingerspan. Which was a 59' long metal enclosure connecting two cliffs together in the shape of a bent finger.

In 2000 Pintos collaboration on the B.I.G (Beach Improvement Group) Project, was various installations such as restrooms, seatwalls, paths, and the "Beacon Overlook". they also landscaped and restored the Palisades, as well. as designed workout area and chess courts.

In 2000 Light Islands was created in Tokamachi City, Japan. this installation consisted of fiberglass tubes illuminated by interior fiber-optics.

In 2008 Pinto completed a permanent work at the Third Street/Convention Center station in Charlotte, NC. The work consists of 20 illuminated fiberglass canopies that provide light and also serve as shelter for users during inclement weather.

In 2014 Pinto created a piece called Land Buoy which is a metal spiral staircase, Standing 55' tall. This installation overlooks the ocean and land of the Washington Avenue Pier on the Delaware River in South Philadelphia.

WOAR
Pinto founded the rape crisis center Women Organized Against Rape in 1972. After seeing how a close friends of Pinto was treated and dealt with after being raped, she felt that the system was failing woman who were going through this trauma and decided to take action and thus WOAR was born. This organization was create through volunteers during the 52nd anniversary of woman's suffrage. WOAR was the first center to organize city institutions to prosecute rape as a crime, and was also the first rape crisis center to gain access to a large city hospital emergency room. Pinto served as director until 1974. The activist working with WOAR found a huge benefit in working alongside politicians, and how impactful a politicians standing on sexual violence could effect their public image and influence. Describing how a Philadelphia political not working with an organization like WOAR was considered political suicide. WOAR continues its work today (2021) partnering with community in its mission to eliminate sexual violence and provide services to any who have experienced it.

Awards and fellowships
Pinto won a National Endowment for the Arts Award in 1979. In 1992 Steve Martino and Jody Pinto were given an Honor Award for their work on the PAPAGO PARK/CITY BOUNDARY PROJECT in Phoenix, Arizona. Pinto was given the ASLA Merit Award, NY 1993 New York Foundation for the Arts Grant Southern Avenue Streetscape/Patrick Park Plaza, Valley Forward/Honeywell, "Crescordia" Environmental Excellence Award, Phoenix, AZ. In 1994 she received a Joan Mitchell Foundation Grant. In 2002 Pinto and those involved in the B.I.G project (Beach Improvement Group Projects)of Santa Monica were given the National ASLA Design Honor Award.

Selected exhibitions
Pinto's work was included in Extended Sensibilities, "the first exhibition to address homosexuality as a subject in art", at The New Museum in New York in 1982.

Collections
Pinto's work is held in many permanent collections including:
 The Museum of Modern Art, New York, NY.
 Whitney Museum of American Art, New York, NY.

Teaching
Pinto began teaching at PAFA in 1978. While there she started the first visiting artist program to bring contemporary artists to speak at the school. She taught at PAFA for 40 years, retiring in 2018.

References

External links

American contemporary artists
American lesbian artists
1942 births
Living people
20th-century American women artists
21st-century American women artists
Public art